Mainetti was an Italian professional cycling team that existed from 1966 to 1967.

The team was selected to race in two editions of the Giro d'Italia, where they achieved three stage wins.

References

Defunct cycling teams based in Italy
1966 establishments in Italy
1967 disestablishments in Italy
Cycling teams established in 1966
Cycling teams disestablished in 1967